Raahe is a town and municipality of Finland. Founded by Swedish statesman and Governor General of Finland Count Per Brahe the Younger in 1649, it is one of 10 historic wooden towns (or town centers) remaining in Finland. Examples of other Finnish historic wooden towns are Kaskinen (Kaskö), Old Rauma, Porvoo (Borgå), Jakobstad (Pietarsaari), and Vaasa (Vasa). After a devastating fire in 1810, Raahe was rebuilt adhering to new design principles which minimized the risk of fire and enlarged some civic spaces. Old Raahe (or "Wooden Raahe") is noted for its Renaissance-inspired rectilinear town plan featuring an unusual central-square (called Pekkatori) with closed corners.

Historically an agricultural and maritime region, Ostrobothnia supplied the largest number of immigrants from Finland to the US and other countries such as Canada and Australia during the great migration of the late 19th and early 20th centuries.

The neighboring municipalities of Raahe are Haapavesi, Oulainen, Pyhäjoki, Siikajoki and Siikalatva. Founded as a Swedish-and-Finnish-speaking town, the municipality is now unilingually Finnish.

Three municipalities have been consolidated with Raahe: Saloinen in 1973, Pattijoki in 2003 and Vihanti in 2013.

The asteroid 1786 Raahe was named after this town and municipality.

History

Before the establishment 
The area of Raahe was originally a part of the parish of Saloinen, known until 1913 as Salo. It was one of the first parishes in northern Ostrobothnia.

Seventeenth century history 

Count Per Brahe the Younger, the governor-general of Finland, gave a charter to the town of Salo (not to be confused with Salo in Finland Proper) in the year of 1649 with the purpose of constructing a town at Satamakangas, near the old harbour site. However, the harbour area had become so low that the future town was decided to be transferred. A new and better location was found further to the north, at the bay of Raahe. Having acquired the possession of the parish of Salo in 1652, Per Brahe renamed the town Brahestad or Raahe in Finnish.

The planning of the town for the purpose of building Raahe was given to the surveyor Claes Claesson. His town plan followed the ideals of the regular grid plan of the Renaissance. All of the streets of Raahe were of equal width of 20-21 cubits or 10–11 meters. The market square stood by Rantakatu and the Town Hall behind the square. At the northeast corner of the town stood the church and the schoolhouse. Six blocks were realized of the town plan, i.e. the area surrounded by present-day Koulukatu, Kirkkokatu, Saaristokatu and Rantakatu. The later expansion and changes of the town have held the ambitions of Claesson's town plan in respect until the beginning of the latest century.

The oldest picture still remaining of the town of Raahe, a seventeenth-century drawing, dates back to the year of 1659. It depicts the town as being surrounded by a so-called customs fence with two custom gates, the eastern one located outside of the crossroads of present-day Brahenkatu and Reiponkatu streets and the southern one at the end of Pitkäkatu street (present-day Kauppakatu street) approximately by present-day Koulukatu street. The busy harbour of the town was located on the shore by the customs warehouse, the present museum.

There were two public buildings in Raahe: a handsome, admirable, two-story town hall with a tower, and a wooden church, whose construction had already begun in 1651. The church was given a weather boarding already in 1684-1685. This is one of the earliest examples of boarding known in Finland.

The dwellings and houses were made from logs. As a rule, they were built close to the street facing plot boundary, the long side and the ridge of the roof parallel to the street. The unbuilt portion of the plot against the street was fitted up with a high, solid plank fence and a drive-in gate. The plots inside a block were not separated by fences. The average house usually consisted of one or two rooms, most of which were of the two-room cabin type. Almost every house in the drawing of Raahe has the most remarkable novelty of the seventeenth century, the chimney. At the same time it was still quite common to have whole towns and villages with chimneyless houses, especially in Eastern Finland. Considered from the point of view of architectural history, at the time of its foundation Raahe was a quite modern town. As far as is known today, no buildings exist from the seventeenth century.

Economy 

Raahe was granted Staple port rights in 1791 and was traditionally a harbor town. With industrialization, Raahe was reinvented as a steel and heavy industry city and has further developed with engineering services, ICT and software production. Raahe is known for steel, heavy machinery, engineering works, shipping and ICT. The Rautaruukki steel mill, which up to the 1980s was the largest single industrial site in the Nordic countries, is located in Raahe. The mill produces steel plate, coil and sheeting and semi-finished products for the engineering works.

Traditionally, Raahe was a port city. In the late Age of Sail, the 1850s and on, shipping companies in Raahe owned Finland's largest fleet of sailing vessels, 60 in total at their height. Currently, the port of Raahe is the sixth busiest port in the country, with 700 ships visiting each year. Cargo that is transported through the port includes raw materials and loose cargo, steel, lumber, containers and contract-shipped goods.

With the steel industry, Raahe has grown into the third largest city in the ex-Oulu province, after Oulu and Kajaani. Like Oulu, the city promotes the ICT business, with the help of the steel industry (ProMetal and Steelpolis) and ICT industry (Softpolis) business incubators/business parks.

The municipal tax rate is 19.75%. In 2007, the structure of the economy was as follows: agriculture and forestry 1%, construction 6%, manufacturing 43%, and retail, services and public services 50%. The sub-region includes the municipalities of Pyhäjoki and Siikajoki.

Transportation
The European route E8 goes through the city, and is the biggest mean of land transportation in Raahe. Raahe also has bus transportation by various companies. The Raahe railway station next to the Raahe Railroad was closed from passenger traffic in 1965. Ticket selling ended in 2000.

International relations

Twin towns — Sister cities

Raahe is twinned with:
 Skellefteå, Sweden, since 1946
 Løgstør, Denmark, since 1946
 Bergen, Norway, since 1946
 Cherepovets, Russia, since 1968
 Košice, Slovakia, since 1987
 Vårgårda, Sweden
 Kullamaa, Estonia

Gallery

See also
Raahe Museum
Tasku beacon tower

References
Notes

External links
 
 
Town of Raahe – Official site
Old Raahe historical information in English, Finnish, German, and Swedish
Finnish Institute of Migration English pages with historical information and databases
Genealogical Society of Finland pages in English
Raahe Guide

 
Cities and towns in Finland
Grand Duchy of Finland
Populated coastal places in Finland
Brahe family
Port cities and towns in Finland
Populated places established in 1649
1649 establishments in Sweden